Water board elections were held in the European Netherlands on 20 March 2019 to elect the resident members of the country's twenty-one water boards (442 seats in total). The elections were held on the same day as the 2019 Dutch provincial elections and island council elections. Water Natuurlijk remained the largest party, winning 85 seats in 20 water boards.

Results

References 

Water boards
2019